Diastylis bidentata is a common benthic crustacean species.

References

Cumacea
Crustaceans described in 1912